The Pavel Roman Memorial is an international ice dancing competition organized by the Czech Skating Association. Named after Pavel Roman, the competition is held annually in Olomouc, Czech Republic.

Medalists

Senior

Junior

Advanced novice

Basic novice

References

External links
 Official site of the Pavel Roman Memorial
 2004 Results
 2005 Results
 2006 Results
 2009 results